Marina Lazarević (born on 3 January 1980 in Belgrade, [then part of PR Serbia in Yugoslavia]) is a Serbian theater, film, and television actress.

Lazarević graduated from Belgrade's Faculty of Drama Arts in 2003, and during her career played many roles in theater. She works now in "Zoran Radmilović" theater in Zaječar.

Selected filmography 
 Gorki plodovi (series, 2008)
 Mansarda 2  (series, 2009)
 U mraku (2011)
 Ulica lipa  (series, 2015)

References

External links 
 Marina Lazarević at the Internet Movie Database
 Grbić J. „Marina Lazarević: Uloga kao pisana za mene”, Večernje novosti, Beograd, 24. mart 2009. 
 Pozorište Timočke krajine „Zoran Radmilović”, Zaječar 

1980 births
Living people
Actresses from Belgrade
21st-century Serbian actresses
Serbian film actresses